Cerautola cuypersi is a butterfly in the family Lycaenidae. It is found in the Democratic Republic of Congo.

References

Butterflies described in 2015
Poritiinae
Butterflies of Africa